First United Presbyterian Church is a historic Presbyterian church now located at 1322 19th Street in Auburn, Nebraska, United States.

The church was organized in 1887 as the Calvert Presbyterian Church.  The building, built in 1906, was designed by Eisenbrant, Pattenger and Colby in Late Gothic Revival style, with auditorium style seating and other features of an Akron Plan church.  On July 15, 1982, it was added to the National Register of Historic Places. It now uses the name of "First Presbyterian Church".

References

External links
More photos of the First United Presbyterian Church at Wikimedia Commons

Presbyterian churches in Nebraska
Buildings and structures in Nemaha County, Nebraska
Churches on the National Register of Historic Places in Nebraska
Akron Plan church buildings
National Register of Historic Places in Nemaha County, Nebraska